Willie Lee Ware (born August 16, 1899), nicknamed "Spider", was an American Negro league baseball player. He played for the Chicago American Giants from 1924 to 1926.

References

External links
 and Seamheads

Year of birth unknown
Year of death unknown
Chicago American Giants players
People from Terrell, Texas